"(Mama) He Treats Your Daughter Mean" is a song written by Johnny Wallace and Herbert J. Lance and recorded by Ruth Brown in 1952. It was Brown's third number-one record on the US Billboard R&B chart and her first pop chart hit.  Brown re-recorded the song in 1962, when it made number 99 on the US pop chart.

Song Background
According to Atlantic Records producer Herb Abramson, Lance wrote the song with his friend Wallace (the brother of the boxer Coley Wallace) after the pair had heard a blues singer on the street in Atlanta, Georgia, singing a mournful song that included the title in its lyrics. The song they heard may have been "One Dime Blues", sung by Blind Lemon Jefferson in the 1920s,  which in the lyrics had the line "Mama, don't treat your daughter mean," and recorded by Blind Willie McTell in 1949. Ruth Brown initially disliked the song but was persuaded by Lance and Wallace to record it in December 1952, after Abramson had speeded up its tempo.

Cover Versions
The song was subsequently recorded by many others, including: 
Anita Wood (1960)
Sarah Vaughan (1962)
Delaney & Bonnie (1970)
Koko Taylor (1975)
 Susan Tedeschi (1998).

References

1953 singles
Ruth Brown songs
1953 songs